Gayan de Silva may refer to:

Gayan de Silva (Bahraini cricketer)
Gayan de Silva (Sri Lankan cricketer, born 1988)
Gayan de Silva (Sri Lankan cricketer, born 1990)